Tiden före nu isa 2005 Tommy Nilsson album.

Track listing
 Vi brann
 Amelia
 Allt ditt hjärta är
 Klockan är 12
 En annan vind
 Vill du ha sex med mig
 God man
 Det bästa av dig
 Kärleken ropar ditt namn
 Farväl

Contributors
Tommy Nilsson - singer, bass, keyboard, drum programming, composer, lyrics
Lasse Andersson - bass, guitar, keyboard, drum programming
Jocke Blomgren - guitar

Charts

Weekly charts

Year-end charts

References 

2005 albums
Tommy Nilsson albums